The Russell-Cotes Museum (formally, the Russell-Cotes Art Gallery & Museum) is an art gallery and museum in Bournemouth, England. A Grade II* listed building originally known as East Cliff Hall, it is located on the top of the East Cliff, next to the Royal Bath Hotel.

History and collections

In 1897, the architect John Frederick Fogerty was commissioned by Merton Russell-Cotes, then the owner of the Royal Bath Hotel, to build a house as a birthday present for his wife Annie. Originally called East Cliff Hall, it was built in the northeast section of his hotel's garden. Built in the Art Nouveau style with interiors by John Thomas and his son Oliver. It was completed in its first form in 1901. 

In 1907, Annie Russell-Cotes donated East Cliff Hall and its contents as a museum to the town of Bournemouth and Merton donated his fine art collection. In return they were made honorary freemen of the town. They continued living in part of the house and over the next ten years they paid for an extension to be built and made further donations including the freehold of the site. It was formally opened by Princess Beatrice in 1919. After their deaths the Borough of Bournemouth took over the running of East Cliff Hall and re-opened it as the Russell-Cotes Art Gallery and Museum on 10 March 1922. After Sir Merton's death, it was extended into his part of the house; a further extension was opened in 2000.

The house and the new annexe display various items collected in the course of Sir Merton's foreign travels, especially to Japan, and paintings from his personal art collection. One room is the Sir Henry Irving Museum; Irving, a friend of the Russell-Cotes', had stayed in that room. When Irving died in 1905, this room was devoted to his memory. Items purchased at the sale of Irving's effects formed the basis of the Irving Museum and were displayed with memorabilia associated with his contemporaries such as Ellen Terry and Sarah Bernhardt.

Exhibitions
Twice-yearly exhibitions of contemporary art support works from the main collection, and have included painter Jonathan Yeo and sculptor Jon Edgar in 2011.

Children's facilities

The new annexe also has a restaurant and a play area for young children. The art gallery in the old annexe displays a wide and frequently changing collection of pictures and statues. Older children are invited to complete a "detective sheet", for example finding where there are pictures of a bat, a kingfisher and other animals and birds.

Gallery

References

External links 

 
 The Joy of Shards Mosaics Resource information

Houses completed in 1901
1919 establishments in England

Buildings and structures in Bournemouth
Biographical museums in Dorset
Art museums and galleries in Dorset
Musical instrument museums
Museums in Bournemouth
Historic house museums in Dorset
Art museums established in 1919
Art Nouveau architecture in England
Tourist attractions in Bournemouth
Grade II* listed buildings in Dorset
Grade II* listed museum buildings